Cathrine Marie Møller (1744–1811) was a Danish embroidery artist, credited with introducing a method of creating light and shadow within embroidery to Denmark. In 1790, she became the second woman inducted into the Royal Danish Academy of Fine Arts.

Early life

Møller was born to Hans Christian Møller and Maren Bølling. At the age of seven she became the ward of her maternal uncle, who had her educated in textile works. After her confirmation, she supported herself as a lady's companion and made embroidery work for money. She also learned to draw to make her needle work easier.

Embroidery

In 1780, Møller became a part of the household of F.A. Müller, who had a large collection of engravings, which reportedly inspired her in her innovation within the art of embroidery. By using black and grey, she created light and shadow within the embroidery images. While this technique had been known in Europe from the late 18th-century, it was not known in Denmark until she introduced it.

In 1789, the director of the Danish Academy, Johannes Wiedewelt, showed her work to the academy without her knowledge. In 1790, she was inducted as the second female member of the academy after Magdalene Bärens.

In 1794, she participated in the exhibition at Charlottenborg.

References

Further reading 
 Risom, Sven:  Cathrine Marie Møller (Fra Frederiksborg Amt, 1962, årg. 57, p. 115 - 124, ill.)

1744 births
1811 deaths
18th-century Danish artists
Danish textile artists
18th-century Danish women artists
Royal Danish Academy of Fine Arts alumni
19th-century women textile artists
19th-century textile artists
18th-century women textile artists
18th-century textile artists
Danish embroiderers